Feese is a German-language surname. Notable people with this surname include:

 Blake Feese (born 1982), American auto racing driver
 Brett Feese (born 1954), former Republican member of the Pennsylvania House of Representatives

See also
 Feser
 Fesser

References

Surnames from nicknames